Aberdonia may refer to:

 Aberdeen city (Latin name)
 Aberdonia (car)
 Aberdonia (yacht)
 5677 Aberdonia an asteroid belt